Shane Patrick Lysaght MacGowan (born 25 December 1957) is an Irish singer-songwriter. He is best known as the lead singer and songwriter of Celtic punk band the Pogues. He was also a member of the Nipple Erectors and Shane MacGowan and the Popes, as well as producing his own solo material and collaborating with artists such as Kirsty MacColl, Joe Strummer, Nick Cave, Steve Earle, Sinéad O'Connor, and Ronnie Drew.

Early life
MacGowan was born on 25 December 1957 in Pembury, Kent, the son of Irish immigrants. His father was from Dublin and his mother was from Tipperary. His mother, Therese, worked as a typist at a convent and had previously been a singer, traditional Irish dancer, and model. His father, Maurice, came from a middle-class background and worked in the offices of department store C&A; he was, in his own words, a "local roustabout". MacGowan's younger sister, Siobhan MacGowan, became a journalist, writer, and songwriter.  He spent childhood holidays in County Tipperary, though never resided in Ireland.

MacGowan lived in many parts of southeast England such as Brighton, London, and London's home counties, and attended an English public school. In 1971, he graduated with a literature scholarship from Holmewood House preparatory school in Langton Green, Kent, and was subsequently accepted into Westminster School. He was found in possession of drugs and expelled in his second year. He was first publicly noted in 1976 at a concert by London punk rock band The Clash, where his earlobe was damaged by future Mo-dettes bassist Jane Crockford. A photographer took a picture of him covered in blood, which made the local papers with the headline "Cannibalism at Clash Gig". Shortly after this, he later joined punk band The Nipple Erectors (later known as 'The Nips'), which featured Shanne Bradley.

Career

1982–1991: Leading The Pogues
MacGowan drew upon his Irish heritage when founding The Pogues and changed his early punk style for a more traditional sound with tutoring from his extended family. Many of his songs are influenced by Irish nationalism, Irish history, the experiences of the Irish diaspora (particularly in England and the United States), and London life in general. These influences are documented in the biography Rake at the Gates of Hell: Shane MacGowan in Context. He has often cited the 19th-century Irish poet James Clarence Mangan and playwright Brendan Behan as influences. Between 1985 and 1987, he co-wrote "Fairytale of New York", which he performed with Kirsty MacColl. In the following years MacGowan and The Pogues released several albums.

1992–2005: Shane MacGowan and The Popes
After The Pogues fired MacGowan for unprofessional behaviour mid-tour, he formed a new band, Shane MacGowan and The Popes, recording two studio albums, a live album, three tracks on The Popes Outlaw Heaven (2010) and a live DVD, and touring internationally. In 1997, MacGowan appeared on Lou Reed's "Perfect Day", covered by numerous artists in aid of Children in Need. It was the UK's number one single for three weeks, in two separate spells. Selling over a million copies, the record contributed £2,125,000 to the charity's highest fundraising total in six years. From December 2003 up to May 2005, Shane MacGowan and The Popes toured extensively in the UK, Ireland and Europe.

2001–2014: Return to The Pogues

The Pogues and MacGowan reformed for a sell-out tour in 2001 and each year from 2004 to 2009 for further tours, including headline slots at Guilfest in England and the Azkena Rock Festival in the Basque Country. In May 2005, MacGowan rejoined The Pogues permanently. That same year, The Pogues re-released "Fairytale of New York" to raise funds for the Justice For Kirsty Campaign and Crisis at Christmas. The single was the best-selling festive-themed single of 2005, reaching number 3 in the UK Charts that year.

In 2006, he was voted 50th in the NME Rock Heroes List. He has been seen many times with The Libertines and Babyshambles singer Pete Doherty. MacGowan has joined Babyshambles on stage. Other famous friends include Johnny Depp, who starred in the video for "That Woman's Got Me Drinking", and Joe Strummer, who referred to MacGowan as "one of the best writers of the century" in an interview featured on the videogram release "Live at the Town And Country Club" from 1988. Strummer occasionally joined MacGowan and The Pogues on stage (and briefly replaced MacGowan as lead singer after his sacking from the band). He has also worked with Nick Cave and joined him on stage.

MacGowan is the subject of several books and paintings. In 2000, Tim Bradford used the title Is Shane MacGowan Still Alive? for a humorous book about Ireland and Irish culture.
Shaman Shane — The Wounded Healer by Stephan Martin brands Shane as a latter-day London-Irish spirit-raiser and exorcist. This commentary is found in the book Myth of Return — The Paintings of Brian Whelan and Collected Commentaries. London Irish artist Brian Whelan paints MacGowan (for example Boy From The County Hell), his works are featured on MacGowan's official website, and is also the illustrator of The Popes Outlaw Heaven cover.

About his future with The Pogues, in a 24 December 2015 interview with Vice magazine, when the interviewer asked whether the band were still active, MacGowan said: "We're not, no," saying that, since their 2001 reunion happened, "I went back with [The] Pogues and we grew to hate each other all over again," adding: "I don't hate the band at all — they're friends. I like them a lot. We were friends for years before we joined the band. We just got a bit sick of each other. We're friends as long as we don't tour together. I've done a hell of a lot of touring. I've had enough of it."

2010–2011: The Shane Gang
In 2010, MacGowan played impromptu shows in Dublin with a new five-piece backing band named The Shane Gang, including In Tua Nua rhythm section Paul Byrne (drums) and Jack Dublin (bass), with manager Joey Cashman on whistle. In November 2010, this line up went to Lanzarote to record a new album. MacGowan and The Shane Gang performed at The Red Hand Rocks music festival in the Patrician Hall, Carrickmore County Tyrone in June 2011.

2011–present
MacGowan made a return to stage on 13 June 2019 at the RDS Arena in Dublin as a guest for Chrissie Hynde and the Pretenders.

Following on from the success of Feis Liverpool 2018's finale in which he was joined by names such as Imelda May, Paddy Moloney, Albert Hammond Jr and many more, MacGowan was announced to appear on 7 July alongside a host of guests for the Feis Liverpool 2019's finale but the event was ultimately cancelled due to a lack of ticket sales and funding issues. Feis Liverpool is the UK's largest celebration of Irish music and culture.

In 2020, MacGowan reportedly returned to the studio to record several new songs with the Irish indie band Cronin led by brothers Johnny and Mick Cronin.

Other work
In 2001, MacGowan coauthored the autobiographical book A Drink with Shane MacGowan with Victoria Mary Clarke.

MacGowan appeared in an episode of Fair City, shown on 28 December 2008.

In 2009, MacGowan starred in the RTÉ reality show Victoria and Shane Grow Their Own, as he and his now-wife Victoria Mary Clarke endeavoured to grow their own food in their own garden.

In 2010, MacGowan offered a piece of unusual art to the Irish Society for the Prevention of Cruelty to Children to auction off to support their services to children: a drawing on a living room door. It ended up earning €1,602 for the charity.

Personal life
On 26 November 2018, after a decades-long relationship and subsequent 11-year engagement, MacGowan married Irish journalist Victoria Mary Clarke in Copenhagen. They reside in Dublin. MacGowan is a Roman Catholic, describing himself as "a free-thinking religious fanatic" who also prays to Buddha. As an adolescent, he considered the priesthood.

In 2001, Sinéad O'Connor reported MacGowan to the police in London for drug possession, in what she said was an attempt to discourage him from using heroin. At first furious, MacGowan later expressed gratitude towards O'Connor and claimed that the incident helped him kick his heroin habit.

In 2015, MacGowan admitted he regretted not joining the IRA.

MacGowan has used a wheelchair following a fall as he was leaving a Dublin studio in the summer of 2015, which fractured his pelvis. He said in an interview with Vice later that year, "It was a fall and I fell the wrong way. I broke my pelvis, which is the worst thing you can do. I'm lame in one leg, I can't walk around the room without a crutch. I am getting better, but it's taking a very long time. It's the longest I've ever taken to recover from an injury. And I've had a lot of injuries." , he continues to use a wheelchair.

MacGowan has long been known for having very bad teeth. He lost the last of his natural teeth sometime around 2008. In 2015, he had a new set of teeth, with one gold tooth, fitted in a nine-hour procedure. These were retained by eight titanium implants in his jaws. The procedure was the subject of the hour-long television programme Shane MacGowan: A Wreck Reborn. The dental surgeon who carried out the procedure commented that MacGowan had recorded most of his great works while he still had some teeth: "We've effectively re-tuned his instrument and that will be an ongoing process."

MacGowan has suffered physically from years of binge drinking. He often performed onstage and gave interviews while drunk. In 2004, on the BBC TV political magazine programme This Week, he gave incoherent and slurred answers to questions from Janet Street-Porter about the public smoking ban in Ireland. MacGowan began drinking at age five, when his family gave him Guinness to help him sleep, and his father frequently took him to the local pub while he drank with his friends.

In 2016, Clarke revealed to the press that MacGowan was sober "for the first time in years." She explained that the origins of MacGowan's drinking problem stemmed from several years of "singing in bars and clubs and other venues where people go to drink and have fun" and that "his whole career has revolved around it and, indeed, been both enhanced and simultaneously inhibited by it". She said that his drinking was not a problem for many years but "went from being just a normal part of life" to becoming very unhealthy, a circumstance made much worse due to the introduction of hard drugs such as heroin. She explained that a serious bout with pneumonia, compounded by an excruciatingly painful hip injury which required a long stay in the hospital, was ultimately responsible for his sobriety. The lengthy hospital stay required a total detox, and MacGowan's sobriety continued after he got home.

MacGowan was hospitalised for an infection on 6 December 2022.

Honours and awards
In January 2018, MacGowan was honoured with a concert gala to celebrate his 60th birthday at the National Concert Hall in Dublin, where he was presented the Lifetime Achievement Award by Irish President Michael D. Higgins. He also won the 2018 Ivor Novello Inspiration Award.

Selected discography

The Nips/Nipple Erectors
Bops, Babes, Booze & Bovver (1987 / 2003 – Archived Compilation)

Albums
With The Pogues:
Red Roses for Me (October 1984)
Rum Sodomy & the Lash (August 1985)
If I Should Fall from Grace with God (January 1988)
Peace and Love (1989)
Hell's Ditch (1990)
The Pogues in Paris: 30th Anniversary concert at the Olympia (November 2012)

As Shane MacGowan and the Popes:
The Snake (1994)
The Crock of Gold (October 1997)
 The Rare Oul' Stuff (2001 / January 2002) (a 2-disc best-of collection of B-sides and key album tracks spanning the years 1994 to 1998)
Across the Broad Atlantic: Live on Paddy's Day — New York and Dublin (with Shane MacGowan and the Popes, February 2002)

Singles
With The Pogues:
Poguetry in Motion EP (No. 29 UK)
"The Irish Rover" (featuring The Dubliners) (No. 8 UK)
"Fairytale of New York" (featuring Kirsty MacColl) – No. 2 UK; reissued in 1991 (No. 24 UK), 2005 (No. 3 UK) and 2007 (No. 4 UK)
"Fiesta" (No. 24 UK)

Solo:
"What a Wonderful World" (with Nick Cave, No. 69 UK 1992)
"The Church of the Holy Spook" (with The Popes, No. 74 UK 1994)
"That Woman's Got Me Drinking" (with The Popes, No. 34 UK 1994)
"Haunted" (with Sinéad O'Connor, No. 30 UK 1995)
"My Way" (No. 29 UK 1996)
"I Put a Spell on You" (Haiti Charity Song) (with Nick Cave, Bobby Gillespie, Chrissie Hynde, Mick Jones with actor Johnny Depp, Glen Matlock, Paloma Faith and Eliza Doolittle) (2010)

Guest appearances
"What a Wonderful World" (with Nick Cave, 1992)
"Suite Sudarmoricaine", "Tri Martolod", "The Foggy Dew" (Foggy Dew) (with Alan Stivell, Again, 1993)
"The Wild Rover" (with Sinéad O'Connor) – Soldat Louis, album Auprès de ma bande, 1993
"God Help Me" (with The Jesus and Mary Chain, Stoned & Dethroned, 1994)
"Death Is Not the End" (on Nick Cave and The Bad Seeds Murder Ballads LP, 1996)
"Perfect Day" (Children in Need single, No. 1 UK, 1997)
"The Wild Rover" and "Good Rats" (with Dropkick Murphys, June 2000)
"Town I Love So Well", "Satan Is Waiting", "Without You", "Long Back Veil" (with Lancaster County Prison, on Every Goddamn Time) Coolidge Records 2003, 
"Ride On" and "Spancill Hill" (with Cruachan, 2004)
"Waiting 'Round to Die" (on The Mighty Stef's 100 Midnights, 2009)
"Four Leaf Lover Boy" and "Full of Sh*t" (on Galia Arad's Ooh La Baby, 2010)
"Little Drummer Boy/Peace on Earth" (on The Priests' Noel, 2010)
"Fix It" (on Alabama 3's Revolver Soul (album), 2010)

Filmography
The Punk Rock Movie – 1979 (archive footage appearance as himself)
Eat the Rich – 1987
Straight to Hell – 1987
The Pogues - Live at the Town & Country – 1988
The Ghosts of Oxford Street – 1991
Shane MacGowan & The Popes: Live at Appalachia 1995 – 1995
The Great Hunger: The Life and Songs of Shane MacGowan – 1997
The Filth and the Fury – 2000 (archive footage appearance as himself)
If I Should Fall From Grace: The Shane MacGowan Story – 2001
The Clash: Westway to the World – 2002 (archive footage appearance as himself)
The Story of Fairytale of New York – 2005
The Libertine – 2005
Harry Hill's TV Burp – 2007
Harry Hill's TV Burp – 2010
The Pogues in Paris: 30th Anniversary concert at the Olympia (DVD) (November 2012)
Crock of Gold: A Few Rounds with Shane MacGowan - 2020

References

External links

1957 births
Living people
20th-century British male singers
Irish baritones
English people of Irish descent
English punk rock singers
English male singer-songwriters
Folk punk musicians
Irish rock singers
Musicians from County Tipperary
Singers from London
Participants in Irish reality television series
People educated at Holmewood House School
People educated at Westminster School, London
The Pogues members
Musicians from Kent
The Nipple Erectors members
People from Tonbridge
Irish male singer-songwriters